Denise Grimsley (born September 21, 1959) is a Republican member of the Florida State Senate, representing parts of Central and Southwest Florida since 2012. She has represented the 26th district, which includes Highlands, Okeechobee, Glades, DeSoto, Hardee, southern Polk, eastern Charlotte, and northern Lee Counties, since 2016, after being redistricted from the 21st district. She previously served four terms in the Florida House of Representatives, representing the Highlands County-based 77th district from 2004 to 2012.

Early life and career
Grimsley was born in Lakeland, and attended Polk Community College, where she received her Associate of Science in Nursing; Warner Southern College, where she received a degree in organizational management; and the University of Miami, where she received her Master of Business Administration. When her father fell ill, she took over the family business, and served as the Chairwoman of the Florida Petroleum Markets and Convenience Stores Association, a trade organization.

Florida House of Representatives
In 2004, when incumbent State Representative Joe Spratt was unable to seek re-election due to term limits, Grimsley ran to succeed him in the 77th District, which included northern Collier County, Glades County, Hendry County, and Highlands County. She faced attorney Gary Gossett in the Republican primary, and won the nomination of the Naples Daily News, which noted, "She has done her homework and would be an able successor to Joe Spratt" due to her experience in the private sector. Grimsley ended up handily defeated Gossett in the primary, winning with 70% of the vote. Upon winning, Grimsley noted, "Obviously you get into the race to win but when you win by this margin, it's very, very humbling. Now it's time to get to work for the general election." She then faced Pauline New Born, the Democratic nominee, but New Born did not present a significant obstacle to Grimsley, and she won her first term in the legislature in a landslide, with 67% of the vote. Running for re-election in 2006, Grimsley was opposed by Zane Thomas, a county planner and the Democratic nominee. She defeated him in a landslide, winning re-election with 60% of the vote to his 40%. In 2008, she faced former North Miami Mayor Elton Gissendanner, who moved to Lake Placid after facing corruption charges from his tenure as Executive Director of the Florida Department of Natural Resources. Despite Gissendanner's high profile, Grimsley easily defeated him to win re-election, scoring 67% of the vote to his 33%. Grimsley was re-elected without opposition in 2010. During her final term in the legislature, she came under fire for accepting a $10,000 contribution from the Walt Disney Corporation and then working to include a $1.2 million appropriation for a Lynx bus route from Orlando International Airport to Disney's Orlando resort. Grimsley, however, disputed that she delivered the project in exchange for the contribution, saying, "I have never discussed these projects with Disney officials. These funds were appropriated by the Transportation and Economic Development Appropriations subcommittee. I trust the subcommittee's judgment that this was a good leverage of tax dollars to facilitate tourism, jobs and infrastructure."

Florida Senate
When Grimsley was prevented from seeking another term in the State House due to term limits, she opted to run for the Florida Senate in the 21st District. She won the Republican primary uncontested, and advanced to the general election, where she faced Stacy Anderson McCland, a lawyer and the Democratic nominee. During the campaign, Grimsley defended the practice by the state of raiding trust funds to balance the budget, observing, "Remember, we walked into a budget situation with a $4.6 billion shortfall two years ago — so, yes, we took money from trust funds and we did a series of reductions in every major policy area of the budget. But, in the Transportation Trust Fund, specifically, the money that we swept out of that trust fund into general revenue never stopped an existing project." In the end, Grimsley won over McCland by a solid margin, receiving 57% of the vote to McCland's 43%.

Grimsley's district was reconfigured and renumbered after court-ordered redistricting in 2016.

Post-senate career 
Grimsley ran in the 2018 Florida Commissioner of Agriculture election, but lost the Republican nomination to Matt Caldwell.

Other
She is one of the founders of Maggie's List.

References

External links
Florida State Senate - Denise Grimsley
Florida House of Representatives - Denise Grimsley

|-

|-

Republican Party members of the Florida House of Representatives
Republican Party Florida state senators
Women state legislators in Florida
1959 births
Living people
University of Miami Business School alumni
Polk State College alumni
Warner University alumni
21st-century American politicians
21st-century American women politicians
People from Lakeland, Florida